Murdo McLennan Tait (born 15 March 1938) was a Scottish footballer who played for Dumbarton.

References

1938 births
Living people
Scottish footballers
Dumbarton F.C. players
Scottish Football League players
Association football inside forwards